Turbonilla louiseae is a species of sea snail, a marine gastropod mollusk in the family Pyramidellidae, the pyrams and their allies.

Description
The shell grows to a length of 9 mm.

Distribution
This species occurs in the Atlantic Ocean off Massachusetts, USA, at depths between 95 mm and 99 m.

References

External links
 To Biodiversity Heritage Library (1 publication)
 To Encyclopedia of Life
 To ITIS
 To World Register of Marine Species

louiseae
Gastropods described in 1954